Nevis Television is a TV channel of Nevis.

History

The Department of Information developed from the Press and Public Affairs Section at the Ministry of the Prime Minister in 1961. Nevis Television opened its broadcast in 1961, who for the first time showed the program of an authoritative publishing house Nevis Newscast (NNC). TV channel its goal, to expand the audience of the TV channel to Nevis. the TV station did not broadcast round the clock, from 6:00 to 10:00 pm, and in the remaining time they passed preventive works. Since 2017 the channel has started round the clock broadcasting and showed music videos

Logos

External links
 

Communications in Saint Kitts and Nevis
Television stations in the Caribbean
Television channels and stations established in 2001
Television in Saint Kitts and Nevis